

{{DISPLAYTITLE:Psi3 Aurigae}}

Psi3 Aurigae, Latinized from ψ3 Aurigae, is a single, blue-white hued star in the northern constellation of Auriga. It is dimly visible to the naked eye with an apparent visual magnitude of +5.20.

This is a B-type giant star with a stellar classification of B8 III. It has about 4.2 and is spinning with a relatively high projected rotational velocity of 118 km/s. The star is radiating 1,624 times the Sun's luminosity from its photosphere at an effective temperature of 13,361 K.

See also
 Psi Aurigae

References

External links
 HR 2420
 Image Psi3 Aurigae

B-type giants
Auriga (constellation)
Aurigae, Psi03
BD+40 1665
Aurigae, 52
047100
031789
2420